Arnaldo Edi Lopes da Silva (born 7 July 1982), known as Edinho, is a Portuguese professional footballer who plays as a striker.

Over 11 seasons, he appeared in 185 Primeira Liga matches and scored a total of 49 goals for Braga (two spells), Paços de Ferreira, Vitória de Setúbal (twice) Marítimo, Académica and Feirense. He also played professionally in Greece, Spain and Turkey.

Edinho won six caps for Portugal in five years.

Club career
Edinho was born in Aveiro, of Guinea-Bissauan descent. After making his professional debut with S.C. Braga, and playing there without much impact, he served two loans from 2005 to 2007; in the second, he scored six goals for Gil Vicente F.C. in the second division.

Edinho was released by Braga prior to the start of the 2007–08 season, joining Vitória F.C. in the Primeira Liga. In January 2008, he was loaned to AEK Athens F.C. in Greece; not an undisputed starter at the former, he put up impressive performances for the latter in his first months, managing to net in five straight games, against Skoda Xanthi F.C. at home (3–0), at OFI Crete FC (1–4), at home against Aris Thessaloniki FC (1–1) and away against Apollon Kalamarias FC (0–1), topping it with another in the 4–0 rout of arch-rivals Olympiacos FC.

On 6 May 2008, the move to AEK was made permanent in a €500,000 deal and Edinho started the new campaign in fashion, scoring once and winning a penalty kick against Panathinaikos F.C. in a 2–1 home win, in the first derby of the year.

Edinho signed with Málaga CF on 17 July 2009, for €900,000. After being irregularly used in the first half of the season, he was loaned for five months to PAOK FC in a return to Greece, with an option to make the move permanent for €1.2 million at its closure. He scored his first goal for the club in a 1–0 victory at Olympiacos, but returned to Andalusia in June 2010.

In December 2010, shortly after the arrival of manager Manuel Pellegrini, Edinho was deemed surplus to requirements at the La Liga side, alongside five other players, but finally stayed at the club. However, on 31 January of the following year, he was loaned to C.S. Marítimo in his country until the end of the season.

On 29 January 2012, without having made a single official appearance for Málaga during 2011–12, Edinho returned to Portugal with Académica de Coimbra having an option to make his loan signing permanent at the end of the campaign. He made his league debut on 13 February, playing 54 minutes as a substitute in a 0–2 home loss against Gil Vicente.

On 21 May 2013, Edinho signed a two-year contract with former club Braga. Again rarely played at the Estádio Municipal de Braga, he took his game to Turkey, where he represented Kayseri Erciyesspor (Süper Lig) and Şanlıurfaspor (TFF First League); he scored 11 goals in his first full season with the former, having previously been named their Player of the Year.

The 34-year-old Edinho returned to his country on 22 August 2016, joining Vitória de Setúbal on a two-year deal. He netted eight times in his debut campaign, helping to a 12th-place finish.

Edinho scored all of his team's goals in a 4–1 away win over C.D. Aves on 29 March 2018. In the ensuing summer, he signed a one-year deal with C.D. Feirense.

International career
In late March 2009, Edinho was called up by Portugal coach Carlos Queiroz for an important 2010 FIFA World Cup qualifier against Sweden and the subsequent friendly with South Africa. He made his debut in the latter in a 2–0 win in Lausanne, Switzerland: after a missed chance early in the second half, he made up in the ensuing corner kick by Deco in the 55th minute, charging into the area to close the scoresheet.

In March 2014, more than four years after his last international, Edinho was selected by manager Paulo Bento for a friendly against Cameroon. He played the second 45 minutes in the match in Leiria, contributing one goal to the 5–1 victory.

Career statistics

Club

International goals

|}

Honours
Vitória Setúbal
Taça da Liga: 2007–08; runner-up 2017–18

AEK
Greek Football Cup runner-up: 2008–09

Académica
Taça de Portugal: 2011–12
Supertaça Cândido de Oliveira runner-up: 2012

Torreense
Liga 3: 2021–22

References

External links

1982 births
Living people
People from Aveiro, Portugal
Portuguese sportspeople of Bissau-Guinean descent
Sportspeople from Aveiro District
Black Portuguese sportspeople
Portuguese footballers
Association football forwards
Primeira Liga players
Liga Portugal 2 players
Segunda Divisão players
F.C. Barreirense players
S.C. Braga B players
S.C. Braga players
F.C. Paços de Ferreira players
Gil Vicente F.C. players
Vitória F.C. players
C.S. Marítimo players
Associação Académica de Coimbra – O.A.F. players
C.D. Feirense players
C.D. Cova da Piedade players
S.C.U. Torreense players
Super League Greece players
AEK Athens F.C. players
PAOK FC players
La Liga players
Málaga CF players
Süper Lig players
TFF First League players
Kayseri Erciyesspor footballers
Şanlıurfaspor footballers
Portugal under-21 international footballers
Portugal international footballers
Portuguese expatriate footballers
Expatriate footballers in Greece
Expatriate footballers in Spain
Expatriate footballers in Turkey
Portuguese expatriate sportspeople in Greece
Portuguese expatriate sportspeople in Spain
Portuguese expatriate sportspeople in Turkey